Finchley Road & Frognal railway station is on Finchley Road in the London Borough of Camden in north London. It is on the North London line, and the station and all trains serving it are operated by London Overground. It is in Travelcard Zone 2. The station is about five minutes walk from Finchley Road Underground station, and is marked as an official out-of-system interchange. The station was opened as Finchley Road St Johns Wood in 1860 on the Hampstead Junction Railway for the connection to the North London Railway.

Service
The typical service at the station in trains per hour is:
 4 westbound to  via Willesden.
 2 westbound to Clapham Junction.
 6 eastbound to  via Camden Road, Highbury and Hackney.

No direct trains run to/from Clapham Junction in the very late evening. The last westbound service terminates at Willesden Junction Low Level (and the first eastbound of the day starts from there).

Connections
London Buses routes 13 and 113 and night route N113 serve the station.

References

External links

Railway stations in the London Borough of Camden
Former London and North Western Railway stations
Railway stations in Great Britain opened in 1860
Railway stations served by London Overground